The End were a Canadian mathcore/metalcore band based in Mississauga, Ontario. Their sound has been compared to that of The Dillinger Escape Plan and deathgrind group Discordance Axis, as well as Neurosis.

History
The End formed in 1999; at that time the members were lead singer Tyler Semrick-Palmateer, guitarists Steve Watson and Andrew Hercules, bassist Sean Dooley, and percussionist Anthony Salajko.

The band's debut full-length album Transfer Trachea Reverberations from Point: False Omniscient was released in 2001, and won a Canadian independent music award for metal album of the year in 2002. The band then went on a summer tour in the US with The Abandoned Hearts Club, followed by a Canadian and US tour with Between the Buried and Me and Life Once Lost.

Their second album, Within Dividia was released in January, 2004 through Relapse Records. The band than toured Canada with The Abandoned Hearts Club again. Their third album, Elementary, was released on Relapse Records in February, 2007. The band made some changes in their musical style for this album, including some partially sung vocals and more melodic song structure. Their song "Throwing Stones" appeared on the soundtrack for the 2007 film The Hills Have Eyes 2.

The band has been dormant since 2008, with little information available as to what happened.

Members

Last Known Lineup

 Aaron Wolff - vocals/percussion
 Steve Watson - guitar
 Sean Dooley - bass
 Anthony Salajko - drums
Andrew Hercules - guitar, songwriter

Former

 Tyler Semrick-Palmateer - vocals

Discography
Studio albums
 Transfer Trachea Reverberations from Point: False Omniscient (2002)
 Within Dividia (2004)
 Elementary (2007)

Singles and Music videos
"Her (Inamorata)" (2002)
"Throwing Stones" (2007)

References

External links
 The End at MySpace
  The End at Relapse Records

Musical groups established in 1999
Musical groups disestablished in 2007
Musical groups from Mississauga
Canadian metalcore musical groups
Mathcore musical groups
Relapse Records artists
1999 establishments in Ontario
2007 disestablishments in Ontario